Rhadinopus is a genus of flowering plants belonging to the family Rubiaceae.

Its native range is Southeastern New Guinea.

Species:

Rhadinopus kurivana 
Rhadinopus papuana

References

Rubiaceae
Rubiaceae genera